Priyamal Perera (born 2 May 1995) is a professional Sri Lankan cricketer. He was part of Sri Lanka's squad for the 2014 ICC Under-19 Cricket World Cup and made his international debut for the Sri Lanka cricket team in March 2019.

Domestic career
In March 2018, he was named in Kandy's squad for the 2017–18 Super Four Provincial Tournament. The following month, he was also named in Kandy's squad for the 2018 Super Provincial One Day Tournament. In August 2018, he was named in Colombo's squad the 2018 SLC T20 League. He was the leading run-scorer for Colts Cricket Club in the 2018–19 Premier League Tournament, with 1,001 runs in ten matches.

In March 2019, he was named in Kandy's squad for the 2019 Super Provincial One Day Tournament. In October 2020, he was drafted by the Kandy Tuskers for the inaugural edition of the Lanka Premier League.

International career
In February 2019, he was named in Sri Lanka's One Day International (ODI) squad for their series against South Africa. He made his ODI debut for Sri Lanka against South Africa on 13 March 2019.

References

External links
 

1995 births
Living people
Sri Lankan cricketers
Sri Lanka One Day International cricketers
Colts Cricket Club cricketers
People from Ragama
Kandy Falcons cricketers